Pamphobeteus fortis also known as the Colombian giant copperhead or Colombian giant brown tarantula is a tarantula which was first described by Anton Ausserer in 1875. As its common name aptly states it is found in Colombia, Venezuela and Panama.

Description 
Females live up to 15 years, while males only to 4. Their carapace is a copper colored, with some black stripping, with a black colored opisthosoma covered in copper like hairs. Their legs are also coppered colored, covered in hairs which are the similar to the ones found in the opisthosoma.

Behavior 
They are opportunistic burrowers, they will usually hide under an existing structure, making a burrow inside the structure. These tarantulas are a bit skittish, but are usually calm. If they feel threatened they will either make a threat pose or fling urticating hairs at your direction. These tarantulas are usually out in the open, but will go and hide if disturbed.

References 

Spiders of South America
Spiders described in 1875
Theraphosidae